Evla, also Dolno Elevci is an abandoned village in the municipality of Centar Župa, North Macedonia.

Demographics
The village when previously inhabited has traditionally been populated by a Turkish speaking community consisting of Turks.

The settlement last had inhabitants in the 1961 census, where it was recorded as being populated by 2 Albanians.

According to the 2002 census, the village had a total of 0 inhabitants.

References

Villages in Centar Župa Municipality
Turkish communities in North Macedonia
Albanian communities in North Macedonia